The Weimar Republic, officially named the German Reich, was a historical period of Germany from 9 November 1918 to 23 March 1933, during which it was a constitutional federal republic for the first time in history; hence it is also referred to, and unofficially proclaimed itself, as the German Republic. The period's informal name is derived from the city of Weimar, which hosted the constituent assembly that established its government. In English, the republic was usually simply called "Germany", with "Weimar Republic" (a term introduced by Adolf Hitler in 1929) not commonly used until the 1930s.

Following the devastation of the First World War (1914–1918), Germany was exhausted and sued for peace in desperate circumstances. Awareness of imminent defeat sparked a revolution, the abdication of Kaiser Wilhelm II, formal surrender to the Allies, and the proclamation of the Weimar Republic on 9 November 1918.

In its initial years, grave problems beset the Republic, such as hyperinflation and political extremism, including political murders and two attempted seizures of power by contending paramilitaries; internationally, it suffered isolation, reduced diplomatic standing and contentious relationships with the great powers. By 1924, a great deal of monetary and political stability was restored, and the republic enjoyed relative prosperity for the next five years; this period, sometimes known as the Golden Twenties, was characterised by significant cultural flourishing, social progress, and gradual improvement in foreign relations. Under the Locarno Treaties of 1925, Germany moved toward normalising relations with its neighbours, recognising most territorial changes under the 1919 Treaty of Versailles and committing to never go to war. The following year, it joined the League of Nations, which marked its reintegration into the international community. Nevertheless, especially on the political right, there remained strong and widespread resentment against the treaty and those who had signed and supported it.

The Great Depression of October 1929 severely impacted Germany's tenuous progress; high unemployment and subsequent social and political unrest led to the collapse of Chancellor Hermann Müller's grand coalition and the beginning of the presidential cabinets. From March 1930 onwards, President Paul von Hindenburg used emergency powers to back Chancellors Heinrich Brüning, Franz von Papen and General Kurt von Schleicher. The Great Depression, exacerbated by Brüning's policy of deflation, led to a surge in unemployment. On 30 January 1933, Hindenburg appointed Adolf Hitler as Chancellor to head a coalition government; Hitler's far-right Nazi Party held two out of ten cabinet seats. Von Papen, as Vice-Chancellor and Hindenburg's confidant, was to serve as the éminence grise who would keep Hitler under control; these intentions badly underestimated Hitler's political abilities. By the end of March 1933, the Reichstag Fire Decree and the Enabling Act of 1933 were used in the perceived state of emergency to effectively grant the new Chancellor broad power to act outside parliamentary control. Hitler promptly used these powers to thwart constitutional governance and suspend civil liberties, which brought about the swift collapse of democracy at the federal and state level, and the creation of a one-party dictatorship under his leadership.

Until the end of World War II in Europe in 1945, the Nazis governed Germany under the pretense that all the extraordinary measures and laws they implemented were constitutional; notably, there was never an attempt to replace or substantially amend the Weimar constitution. Nevertheless, Hitler's seizure of power (Machtergreifung) had effectively ended the republic, replacing its constitutional framework with Führerprinzip, the principle that "the Führer's word is above all written law".

Name and symbols
The Weimar Republic is so called because the assembly that adopted its constitution met in Weimar from 6 February to 11 August 1919, but this name only became mainstream after 1933.

Terminology

Between 1919 and 1933, no single name for the new state gained widespread acceptance, thus the old name  was officially retained, although hardly anyone used it during the Weimar period. To the right of the spectrum, the politically engaged rejected the new democratic model and were appalled to see the honour of the traditional word Reich associated with it. Zentrum, the Catholic Centre Party, favoured the term  (German People's State), while on the moderate left Chancellor Friedrich Ebert's Social Democratic Party of Germany preferred  (German Republic).

The first recorded mention of the term  (Republic of Weimar) came during a speech delivered by Adolf Hitler at a Nazi Party rally in Munich on 24 February 1929. A few weeks later, the term  was first used again by Hitler in a newspaper article. Only during the 1930s did the term become mainstream, both within and outside Germany.

According to historian Richard J. Evans:
The continued use of the term 'German Empire', Deutsches Reich, by the Weimar Republic ... conjured up an image among educated Germans that resonated far beyond the institutional structures Bismarck created: the successor to the Roman Empire; the vision of God's Empire here on earth; the universality of its claim to suzerainty; and a more prosaic but no less powerful sense, the concept of a German state that would include all German speakers in central Europe—'one People, one Reich, one Leader', as the Nazi slogan was to put it.

Flag and coat of arms

The black-red-gold tricolor of the 1848 German revolutions was named as the national flag in the Weimar Constitution. It was abolished in 1935 after the Nazi Party had come to power. The coat of arms was initially based on the Reichsadler ("imperial eagle") introduced by the Paulskirche Constitution of 1849, and announced in November 1911. In 1928, a new design by Karl-Tobias Schwab was adopted as national coat of arms, which was used until being replaced by the Nazi Reichsadler in 1935, and readopted by the Federal Republic of Germany in 1950.

Armed forces

After the dissolution of the army of the former German Empire, known as the Deutsches Heer (simply "German Army") or the Reichsheer ("Army of the Realm") in 1918; Germany's military forces consisted of irregular paramilitaries, namely the various right-wing Freikorps ("Free Corps") groups composed of veterans from the war. The Freikorps units were formally disbanded in 1920 (although continued to exist in underground groups), and on 1 January 1921, a new Reichswehr (figuratively; Defence of the realm) was created.

The Treaty of Versailles limited the size of the Reichswehr to 100,000 soldiers (consisting of seven infantry divisions and three cavalry divisions), 10 armoured cars and a navy (the Reichsmarine) restricted to 36 ships in active service. No aircraft of any kind was allowed. The main advantage of this limitation, however, was that the Reichswehr could afford to pick the best recruits for service. However, with inefficient armour and no air support, the Reichswehr would have had limited combat abilities.
Privates were mainly recruited from the countryside, as it was believed that young men from cities were prone to socialist behaviour, which would fray the loyalty of the privates to their conservative officers.

Although technically in service of the republic, the army was predominantly officered by conservative reactionaries who were sympathetic to right-wing organisations. Hans von Seeckt, the head of the Reichswehr, declared that the army was not loyal to the democratic republic, and would only defend it if it were in their interests. During the Kapp Putsch for example, the army refused to fire upon the rebels. The vulgar and turbulent SA was the Reichswehr's main opponent throughout its existence, openly seeking to absorb the army, and the army fired at them during the Beer Hall Putsch. With the ascendance of the SS, the Reichswehr took a softer line about the Nazis, as the SS presented itself as elitist, respectable, orderly, and busy reforming and dominating the police rather than the army.

In 1935, two years after Adolf Hitler's rise to power, the Reichswehr was renamed the Wehrmacht (Defense Force). The Wehrmacht was the unified armed forces of the Nazi regime, which consisted of the Heer (army), the Kriegsmarine (navy) and the Luftwaffe (air force).

History

Background

Hostilities in World War I took place between 28 July 1914 and 11 November 1918, during which over 70 million military personnel were mobilised; the war ended with 20 million military and civilian deaths—exclusive of fatalities from the 1918 Spanish flu pandemic, which accounted for millions more—making it one of the largest and deadliest wars in history.

After four years of war on multiple fronts in Europe and around the world, the final Allied offensive began in August 1918, and the position of Germany and the Central Powers deteriorated, leading them to sue for peace. Initial offers were rejected by the Allied Powers, and Germany's position became more desperate. Awareness of impending military defeat sparked the German Revolution, proclamation of a republic on 9 November 1918, the abdication of Kaiser Wilhelm II, and German surrender, marking the end of Imperial Germany and the beginning of the Weimar Republic.

November Revolution (1918–1919)

In October 1918, the constitution of the German Empire was reformed to give more powers to the elected parliament. On 29 October, rebellion broke out in Kiel among sailors. There, sailors, soldiers, and workers began electing Workers' and Soldiers' Councils (Arbeiter- und Soldatenräte) modelled after the Soviets of the Russian Revolution of 1917. The revolution spread throughout Germany, and participants seized military and civil powers in individual cities. The power takeover was achieved everywhere without loss of life.

At the time, the Socialist movement which represented mostly labourers was split among two major left-wing parties: the Independent Social Democratic Party of Germany (USPD), which called for immediate peace negotiations and favoured a soviet-style command economy, and the Social Democratic Party of Germany (SPD) also known as "Majority" Social Democratic Party of Germany (MSPD), which supported the war effort and favoured a parliamentary system. The rebellion caused great fear in the establishment and in the middle classes because of the Soviet-style aspirations of the councils. To centrist and conservative citizens, the country looked to be on the verge of a communist revolution.

By 7 November, the revolution had reached Munich, resulting in King Ludwig III of Bavaria fleeing. The MSPD decided to make use of their support at the grassroots and put themselves at the front of the movement, demanding that Kaiser Wilhelm II abdicate. When he refused, Prince Max of Baden simply announced that he had done so and frantically attempted to establish a regency under another member of the House of Hohenzollern. Gustav Noske, a self-appointed military expert in the MSPD, was sent to Kiel to prevent any further unrest and took on the task of controlling the mutinous sailors and their supporters in the Kiel barracks. The sailors and soldiers, inexperienced in matters of revolutionary combat, welcomed him as an experienced politician and allowed him to negotiate a settlement, thus defusing the initial anger of the revolutionaries in uniform.

On 9 November 1918, the "German Republic" was proclaimed by MSPD member Philipp Scheidemann at the Reichstag building in Berlin, to the fury of Friedrich Ebert, the leader of the MSPD, who thought that the question of monarchy or republic should be answered by a national assembly. The proclamation was issued by Karl Liebknecht, co-leader (with Rosa Luxemburg) of the communist Spartakusbund (Spartacus League), a group of a few hundred supporters of the Russian Revolution that had allied itself with the USPD in 1917. In a legally questionable act, Imperial Chancellor (Reichskanzler) Prince Max of Baden transferred his powers to Friedrich Ebert, who, shattered by the monarchy's fall, reluctantly accepted. In view of the mass support for more radical reforms among the workers' councils, a coalition government called "Council of the People's Deputies" (Rat der Volksbeauftragten) was established, consisting of three MSPD and three USPD members. Led by Ebert for the MSPD and Hugo Haase for the USPD it sought to act as a provisional cabinet of ministers. But the power question was unanswered. Although the new government was confirmed by the Berlin worker and soldier council, it was opposed by the Spartacus League.

On 11 November 1918, an armistice was signed at Compiègne by German representatives. It effectively ended military operations between the Allies and Germany. It amounted to German capitulation, without any concessions by the Allies; the naval blockade would continue until complete peace terms were agreed.

From November 1918 to January 1919, Germany was governed by the "Council of the People's Deputies", under the leadership of Ebert and Haase. The Council issued a large number of decrees that radically shifted German policies. It introduced the eight-hour workday, domestic labour reform, works councils, agricultural labour reform, right of civil-service associations, local municipality social welfare relief (split between Reich and States) and national health insurance, reinstatement of demobilised workers, protection from arbitrary dismissal with appeal as a right, regulated wage agreement, and universal suffrage from 20 years of age in all types of elections—local and national. Ebert called for a "National Congress of Councils" (Reichsrätekongress), which took place from 16 to 20 December 1918, and in which the MSPD had the majority. Thus, Ebert was able to institute elections for a provisional National Assembly that would be given the task of writing a democratic constitution for parliamentary government, marginalising the movement that called for a socialist republic.

To ensure his fledgling government maintained control over the country, Ebert made an agreement with the OHL, now led by Ludendorff's successor General Wilhelm Groener. The 'Ebert–Groener pact' stipulated that the government would not attempt to reform the army so long as the army swore to protect the state. On the one hand, this agreement symbolised the acceptance of the new government by the military, assuaging concern among the middle classes; on the other hand, it was thought contrary to working-class interests by left wing social democrats and communists and was also opposed by the far right who believed democracy would make Germany weaker. The new Reichswehr armed forces, limited by the Treaty of Versailles to 100,000 army soldiers and 15,000 sailors, remained fully under the control of the German officer class, despite their nominal re-organisation.

The Executive Council of the Workers' and Soldiers' Councils, a coalition that included Majority Socialists, Independent Socialists, workers, and soldiers, implemented a programme of progressive social change, introducing reforms such as the eight-hour workday, the releasing of political prisoners, the abolition of press censorship, increases in workers' old-age, sick and unemployment benefits, and the bestowing upon labour the unrestricted right to organise into unions.

A number of other reforms were carried out in Germany during the revolutionary period. It was made harder for estates to sack workers and prevent them from leaving when they wanted to; under the Provisional Act for Agricultural Labour of 23 November 1918 the normal period of notice for management, and for most resident labourers, was set at six weeks. In addition, a supplementary directive of December 1918 specified that female (and child) workers were entitled to a fifteen-minute break if they worked between four and six hours, thirty minutes for workdays lasting six to eight hours, and one hour for longer days. A decree on 23 December 1918 established committees (composed of workers' representatives "in their relation to the employer") to safeguard the rights of workers. The right to bargain collectively was also established, while it was made obligatory "to elect workers' committees on estates and establish conciliation committees". A decree on 3 February 1919 removed the right of employers to acquire exemption for domestic servants and agricultural workers.

With the Verordnung of 3 February 1919, the Ebert government reintroduced the original structure of the health insurance boards according to an 1883 law, with one-third employers and two-thirds members (i.e. workers). From 28 June 1919 health insurance committees became elected by workers themselves. The Provisional Order of January 1919 concerning agricultural labour conditions fixed 2,900 hours as a maximum per year, distributed as eight, ten, and eleven hours per day in four-monthly periods. A code of January 1919 bestowed upon land-labourers the same legal rights that industrial workers enjoyed, while a bill ratified that same year obliged the States to set up agricultural settlement associations which, as noted by Volker Berghahn, "were endowed with the priority right of purchase of farms beyond a specified size". In addition, undemocratic public institutions were abolished, involving, as noted by one writer, the disappearance "of the Prussian Upper House, the former Prussian Lower House that had been elected in accordance with the three-class suffrage, and the municipal councils that were also elected on the class vote".

A rift developed between the MSPD and USPD after Ebert called upon the OHL (Supreme Army Command) for troops to put down a mutiny by a leftist military unit on 23/24 December 1918, in which members of the Volksmarinedivision (People's Army Division) had captured the city's garrison commander Otto Wels and occupied the Reichskanzlei (Reich Chancellery) where the "Council of the People's Deputies" was situated. The ensuing street fighting left several dead and injured on both sides. The USPD leaders were outraged by what they believed was treachery by the MSPD, which, in their view, had joined with the anti-communist military to suppress the revolution. Thus, the USPD left the "Council of the People's Deputies" after only seven weeks. On 30 December, the split deepened when the Communist Party of Germany (KPD) was formed out of a number of radical left-wing groups, including the left wing of the USPD and the Spartacus League group.

In January, the Spartacus League and others in the streets of Berlin made more armed attempts to establish communism, known as the Spartacist uprising. Those attempts were put down by paramilitary Freikorps units consisting of volunteer soldiers. Bloody street fights culminated in the beating and shooting deaths of Rosa Luxemburg and Karl Liebknecht after their arrests on 15 January. With the affirmation of Ebert, those responsible were not tried before a court-martial, leading to lenient sentences, which made Ebert unpopular among radical leftists.

The National Assembly elections took place on 19 January 1919; it was the first time women were allowed to vote. In this time, the radical left-wing parties, including the USPD and KPD, were barely able to get themselves organised, leading to a solid majority of seats for the MSPD moderate forces. To avoid the ongoing fights in Berlin, the National Assembly convened in the city of Weimar, giving the future Republic its unofficial name. The Weimar Constitution created a republic under a parliamentary republic system with the Reichstag elected by proportional representation. The democratic parties obtained a solid 80% of the vote.

During the debates in Weimar, fighting continued. A Soviet republic was declared in Munich but quickly put down by Freikorps and remnants of the regular army. The fall of the Munich Soviet Republic to these units, many of which were situated on the extreme right, resulted in the growth of far-right movements and organisations in Bavaria, including Organisation Consul, the Nazi Party, and societies of exiled Russian Monarchists. Sporadic fighting continued to flare up around the country. In eastern provinces, forces loyal to Germany's fallen Monarchy fought the republic, while militias of Polish nationalists fought for independence: Great Poland Uprising in Provinz Posen and three Silesian uprisings in Upper Silesia.

Germany lost the war because the country ran out of allies and its economic resources were running out; support among the population began to crumble in 1916 and by mid-1918 there was support for the war only among the die-hard monarchists and conservatives. The decisive blow came with the entry of the United States into the conflict, which made its vast industrial resources available to the beleaguered Allies. By late summer 1918, the German reserves were exhausted while fresh American troops arrived in France at the rate of 10,000 a day. Retreat and defeat were at hand, and the Army told the Kaiser to abdicate for it could no longer support him. Although in retreat, the German armies were still on French and Belgian territory when the war ended on 11 November. Ludendorf and Hindenburg soon proclaimed that it was the defeatism of the civilian population that had made defeat inevitable. The die-hard nationalists then blamed the civilians for betraying the army and the surrender. This was the "stab-in-the-back myth" that was unceasingly propagated by the right in the 1920s and ensured that many monarchists and conservatives would refuse to support the government of what they called the "November criminals".

Years of crisis (1919–1923)

Burden from the First World War
In the four years following the First World War, the situation for German civilians remained dire. The severe food shortages improved little to none up until 1923. Many German civilians expected life to return to prewar normality following the removal of the naval blockade in June 1919. Instead, the struggles induced by the First World War persisted for the decade following. Throughout the war German officials made rash decisions to combat the growing hunger of the nation, most of which were highly unsuccessful. Examples include the nationwide pig slaughter, Schweinemord, in 1915. The rationale behind exterminating the population of swine was to decrease the use of potatoes and turnips for animal consumption, transitioning all foods toward human consumption.

In 1922, three years after the German signing of the Treaty of Versailles, meat consumption in the country had not increased since the war era. 22 kg per person per year was still less than half of the 52 kg statistic in 1913, before the onset of the war. German citizens felt the food shortages even deeper than during the war, because the reality of the nation contrasted so starkly with their expectations. The burdens of the First World War lightened little in the immediate years following, and with the onset of the Treaty of Versailles, coupled by mass inflation, Germany still remained in a crisis. The continuity of pain showed the Weimar authority in a negative light, and public opinion was one of the main sources behind its failure.

Treaty of Versailles

The growing post-war economic crisis was a result of lost pre-war industrial exports, the loss of supplies in raw materials and foodstuffs due to the continental blockade, the loss of the colonies, and worsening debt balances, exacerbated by an exorbitant issue of promissory notes raising money to pay for the war. Military-industrial activity had almost ceased, although controlled demobilisation kept unemployment at around one million. In part, the economic losses can also be attributed to the Allied blockade of Germany until the Treaty of Versailles.

The Allies permitted only low import levels of goods that most Germans could not afford. After four years of war and famine, many German workers were exhausted, physically impaired and discouraged. Millions were disenchanted with what they considered capitalism and hoping for a new era. Meanwhile, the currency depreciated, and would continue to depreciate following the French invasion of the Ruhr.

The treaty was signed 28 June 1919 and is easily divided into four categories: territorial issues, disarmament demands, reparations, and assignment of guilt. The German colonial empire was stripped and given over to Allied forces. The greater blow to Germans however was that they were forced to give up the territory of Alsace-Lorraine. Many German borderlands were demilitarised and allowed to self-determine. The German military was forced to have no more than 100,000 men with only 4,000 officers. Germany was forced to destroy all its fortifications in the West and was prohibited from having an air force, tanks, poison gas, and heavy artillery. Many ships were scuttled, and submarines and dreadnoughts were prohibited. Germany was forced under Article 235 to pay 20 billion gold marks, about 4.5 billion dollars by 1921. Article 231 placed Germany and her allies with responsibility for causing all the loss and damage suffered by the Allies. While Article 235 angered many Germans, no part of the treaty was more fought over than Article 231.

The German peace delegation in France signed the Treaty of Versailles, accepting mass reductions of the German military, the prospect of substantial war reparations payments to the victorious allies, and the controversial "War Guilt Clause". Explaining the rise of extreme nationalist movements in Germany shortly after the war, British historian Ian Kershaw points to the "national disgrace" that was "felt throughout Germany at the humiliating terms imposed by the victorious Allies and reflected in the Versailles Treaty...with its confiscation of territory on the eastern border and even more so its 'guilt clause'." Adolf Hitler repeatedly blamed the republic and its democracy for accepting the oppressive terms of this treaty. The Republic's first Reichspräsident ("Reich President"), Friedrich Ebert of the SPD, signed the new German constitution into law on 11 August 1919.

The new post-World War Germany, stripped of all colonies, became 13% smaller in its European territory than its imperial predecessor. Of these losses, a large proportion consisted of provinces that were originally Polish, and the Imperial Territory of Alsace–Lorraine, seized by Germany in 1870, and where Germans constituted a majority within the Alsatian portion of said imperial province and also within half of Lorraine.

Allied Rhineland occupation

The occupation of the Rhineland took place following the Armistice with Germany of 11 November 1918. The occupying armies consisted of American, Belgian, British and French forces.

In 1920, under massive French pressure, the Saar was separated from the Rhine Province and administered by the League of Nations until a plebiscite in 1935, when the region was returned to the Deutsches Reich. At the same time in 1920, the districts of Eupen and Malmedy were transferred to Belgium (see German-Speaking Community of Belgium). Shortly after, France completely occupied the Rhineland, strictly controlling all important industrial areas.

Reparations
The actual amount of reparations that Germany was obliged to pay out was not the 132 billion marks decided in the London Schedule of 1921 but rather the 50 billion marks stipulated in the A and B Bonds. Historian Sally Marks says the 112 billion marks in "C bonds" were entirely chimerical—a device to fool the public into thinking Germany would pay much more. The actual total payout from 1920 to 1931 (when payments were suspended indefinitely) was 20 billion marks, worth about US$5 billion or £1 billion stg. 12.5 billion was cash that came mostly from loans from New York bankers. The rest was goods such as coal and chemicals, or from assets like railway equipment. The reparations bill was fixed in 1921 on the basis of a German capacity to pay, not on the basis of Allied claims. The highly publicised rhetoric of 1919 about paying for all the damages and all the veterans' benefits was irrelevant for the total, but it did determine how the recipients spent their share. Germany owed reparations chiefly to France, Britain, Italy and Belgium; the US Treasury received $100 million.

Hyperinflation

In the early post-war years, inflation was growing at an alarming rate, but the government simply printed more currency to pay debts. By 1923, the Republic claimed it could no longer afford the reparations payments required by the Versailles Treaty, and the government defaulted on some payments. In response, French and Belgian troops occupied the Ruhr region, Germany's most productive industrial region at the time, taking control of most mining and manufacturing companies in January 1923. Strikes were called, and passive resistance was encouraged. These strikes lasted eight months, further damaging both the economy and society.

The strike prevented some goods from being produced, but one industrialist, Hugo Stinnes, was able to create a vast empire out of bankrupt companies. Because the production costs in Germany were falling almost hourly, the prices for German products were unbeatable. Stinnes made sure that he was paid in dollars, which meant that by mid-1923, his industrial empire was worth more than the entire German economy. By the end of the year, over two hundred factories were working full-time to produce paper for the spiraling bank note production. Stinnes' empire collapsed when the government-sponsored inflation was stopped in November 1923.

In 1919, one loaf of bread cost 1 mark; by 1923, the same loaf of bread cost 100 billion marks.

Since striking workers were paid benefits by the state, much additional currency was printed, fuelling a period of hyperinflation. The 1920s German inflation started when Germany had no goods to trade. The government printed money to deal with the crisis; this meant payments within Germany were made with worthless paper money, and helped formerly great industrialists to pay back their own loans. This also led to pay raises for workers and for businessmen who wanted to profit from it. Circulation of money rocketed, and soon banknotes were being overprinted to a thousand times their nominal value and every town produced its own promissory notes; many banks and industrial firms did the same.

The value of the Papiermark had declined from 4.2 marks per U.S. dollar in 1914 to one million per dollar by August 1923. This led to further criticism of the Republic. On 15 November 1923, a new currency, the Rentenmark (RM), was introduced by Stresemann at the rate of one trillion (1,000,000,000,000) Papiermark for one Rentenmark, an action known as redenomination. At that time, one U.S. dollar was equal to RM 4.20. Reparation payments were resumed, and the Ruhr was returned to Germany under the Locarno Treaties, which defined the borders between Germany, France, and Belgium.

War guilt question

In the wake of the Treaty of Versailles which placed the responsibility for the outbreak of the war entirely on Germany and imposed crushing reparations upon Germany because of it, the question of German war guilt became a central point of debate in Germany both among politicians and historians, and also among the general public. The war guilt question pervaded the entire history of the Weimar Republic. Weimar embodied this debate until its demise, after which it was subsequently taken up as a campaign argument by the Nazi Party. This debate also took place in other countries involved in the conflict, such as in the French Third Republic and the United Kingdom.

Entire organizations were formed in Germany chiefly to consider this question, including the War Guilt Section and the Center for the Study of the Causes of the War; existing institutions such as the Potsdam Reichsarchiv spent significant resources researching or propagandizing about it. In 1919 the Weimar National Assembly established an inquiry into guilt for the war that met in four subcommittees until the July 1932 election.

While the war guilt question made it possible to investigate the deep-rooted causes of the First World War, although not without provoking a great deal of controversy, it also made it possible to identify other aspects of the conflict, such as the role of the masses and the question of Germany's special path to democracy, the Sonderweg.

The war guilt debate motivated numerous historians such as Hans Delbrück, Wolfgang J. Mommsen, and Gerhard Hirschfeld to take part. In 1961, German historian Fritz Fischer published Germany's Aims in the First World War, in which he argued that the German government had an expansionist foreign policy and had started a war of aggression in 1914. Fischer's thesis ignited a furious debate in Germany, which became known as the Fischer controversy.

A century after the original events, this debate continues among historians into the 21st century. The main outlines of the debate include: how much room to maneuver was available diplomatically and politically; the inevitable consequences of pre-war armament policies; the role of domestic policy and social and economic tensions in the foreign relations of the states involved; the role of public opinion and their experience of war in the face of organized propaganda; the role of economic interests and top military commanders in torpedoing deescalation and peace negotiations; the  theory; and the long-term trends which tend to contextualize the First World War as a condition or preparation for the Second, such as Raymond Aron who views the two world wars as the new Thirty Years' War, a theory reprised by Enzo Traverso in his work.

Political turmoil: political murders, and attempted power seizures

The Republic was soon under attack from both left- and right-wing sources. The radical left accused the ruling Social Democrats of having betrayed the ideals of the workers' movement by preventing a communist revolution and sought to overthrow the Republic to do so themselves. Various right-wing sources opposed any democratic system, preferring an authoritarian monarchy like the German Empire. To further undermine the Republic's credibility, some right-wingers (especially certain members of the former officer corps) also blamed an alleged conspiracy of Socialists and Jews for Germany's defeat in the First World War.

In the next five years, the central government, assured of the support of the Reichswehr, dealt severely with the occasional outbreaks of violence in Germany's large cities. The left claimed that the Social Democrats had betrayed the ideals of the revolution, while the army and the government-financed Freikorps committed hundreds of acts of gratuitous violence against striking workers.

The first challenge to the Weimar Republic came when a group of communists and anarchists took over the Bavarian government in Munich and declared the creation of the Bavarian Soviet Republic. The uprising was brutally attacked by Freikorps, which consisted mainly of ex-soldiers dismissed from the army and who were well-paid to put down forces of the Far Left. The Freikorps was an army outside the control of the government, but they were in close contact with their allies in the Reichswehr.

On 13 March 1920 during the Kapp Putsch, 12,000 Freikorps soldiers occupied Berlin and installed Wolfgang Kapp, a right-wing journalist, as chancellor. The national government fled to Stuttgart and called for a general strike against the putsch. The strike meant that no "official" pronouncements could be published, and with the civil service out on strike, the Kapp government collapsed after only four days on 17 March.

Inspired by the general strikes, a workers' uprising began in the Ruhr region when 50,000 people formed a "Red Army" and took control of the province. The regular army and the Freikorps ended the uprising on their own authority. The rebels were campaigning for an extension of the plans to nationalise major industries and supported the national government, but the SPD leaders did not want to lend support to the growing USPD, who favoured the establishment of a socialist regime. The repression of an uprising of SPD supporters by the reactionary forces in the Freikorps on the instructions of the SPD ministers was to become a major source of conflict within the socialist movement and thus contributed to the weakening of the only group that could have withstood the Nazi movement. Other rebellions were put down in March 1921 in Saxony and Hamburg.

One of the manifestations of the sharp political polarisation that had occurred were the right-wing motivated assassinations of important representatives of the young republic. In August 1921, Finance Minister Matthias Erzberger and Foreign Minister Walther Rathenau were murdered by members of the Organisation Consul. While Erzberger was attacked for signing the armistice agreement in 1918, Rathenau as foreign minister was responsible, among other things, for the reparations issue. He had also sought to break Germany's isolation after World War I through the 1922 Treaty of Rapallo with the Russian Soviet Federative Socialist Republic. However, he also drew right-wing extremist hatred as a Jew (see also Weimar antisemitism). However, right-wing state criminals were not permanently deterred from their activities, and the lenient sentences they were given by judges influenced by imperial conservatism were a contributing factor.

In 1922, Germany signed the Treaty of Rapallo with the Soviet Russia, which allowed Germany to train military personnel in exchange for giving Russia military technology. This was against the Treaty of Versailles, which limited Germany to 100,000 soldiers and no conscription, naval forces of 15,000 men, twelve destroyers, six battleships, and six cruisers, no submarines or aircraft. However, Russia had pulled out of the First World War against the Germans as a result of the 1917 Russian Revolution and was excluded from the League of Nations. Thus, Germany seized the chance to make an ally. Walther Rathenau, the Jewish Foreign Minister who signed the treaty, was assassinated two months later by two ultra-nationalist army officers.

Further pressure from the political right came in 1923 with the Beer Hall Putsch (aka Munich Putsch), a failed power seizure staged by the Nazi Party under Adolf Hitler in Munich. In 1920, the German Workers' Party had become the National Socialist German Workers' Party (NSDAP), or Nazi Party, which would eventually become a driving force in the collapse of Weimar. Hitler named himself as chairman of the party in July 1921. On 8 November 1923, the Kampfbund, in a pact with Erich Ludendorff, took over a meeting by Bavarian prime minister Gustav von Kahr at a beer hall in Munich.

Ludendorff and Hitler declared that the Weimar government was deposed and that they were planning to take control of Munich the following day. But the 3,000 rebels were no match yet for the Bavarian authorities. Hitler was arrested and sentenced to five years in prison for high treason, the minimum sentence for the charge. However, Hitler served less than eight months, in a comfortable cell, receiving a daily stream of visitors, until his release on 20 December 1924. While in jail, Hitler dictated Mein Kampf, which laid out his ideas and future policies. Hitler now decided to focus on legal methods of gaining power.

Golden Era (1924–1929)

Gustav Stresemann was Reichskanzler for 100 days in 1923, and served as foreign minister from 1923 to 1929, a period of relative stability for the Weimar Republic, known in Germany as Goldene Zwanziger ("Golden Twenties"). Prominent features of this period were a growing economy and a consequent decrease in civil unrest.

Once civil stability had been restored, Stresemann began stabilising the German currency, which promoted confidence in the German economy and helped the recovery that was so greatly needed for the German nation to keep up with their reparation repayments, while at the same time feeding and supplying the nation.

Once the economic situation had stabilised, Stresemann could begin putting a permanent currency in place, called the Rentenmark (October 1923), which again contributed to the growing level of international confidence in the Weimar Republic's economy.

To help Germany meet reparation obligations, the Dawes Plan was created in 1924. This was an agreement between American banks and the German government in which the American banks lent money to German banks with German assets as collateral to help it pay reparations. The German railways, the National Bank and many industries were therefore mortgaged as securities for the stable currency and the loans.

Germany was the first state to establish diplomatic relations with the new Soviet Union. Under the Treaty of Rapallo, Germany accorded it formal (de jure) recognition, and the two mutually cancelled all pre-war debts and renounced war claims. In October 1925 the Treaty of Locarno was signed by Germany, France, Belgium, Britain, and Italy; it recognised Germany's borders with France and Belgium. Moreover, Britain, Italy and Belgium undertook to assist France in the case that German troops marched into the demilitarised Rhineland. Locarno paved the way for Germany's admission to the League of Nations in 1926. Germany signed arbitration conventions with France and Belgium and arbitration treaties with Poland and Czechoslovakia, undertaking to refer any future disputes to an arbitration tribunal or to the Permanent Court of International Justice. Other foreign achievements were the evacuation of foreign troops from the Ruhr in 1925. In 1926, Germany was admitted to the League of Nations as a permanent member, improving her international standing and giving the right to vote on League matters.

Overall trade increased and unemployment fell. Stresemann's reforms did not relieve the underlying weaknesses of Weimar but gave the appearance of a stable democracy. Even Stresemann's German People's Party failed to gain nationwide recognition, and instead featured in the 'flip-flop' coalitions. The Grand Coalition headed by Muller inspired some faith in the government, but that did not last. Governments frequently lasted only a year, comparable to the political situation in France during the 1930s. The major weakness in constitutional terms was the inherent instability of the coalitions, which often fell prior to elections. The growing dependence on American finance was to prove fleeting, and Germany was one of the worst hit nations in the Great Depression.

Culture

The 1920s saw a remarkable cultural renaissance in Germany. During the worst phase of hyperinflation in 1923, the clubs and bars were full of speculators who spent their daily profits so they would not lose the value the following day. Berlin intellectuals responded by condemning the excesses of what they considered capitalism and demanding revolutionary changes on the cultural scenery.

Influenced by the brief cultural explosion in the Soviet Union, German literature, cinema, theatre and musical works entered a phase of great creativity. Innovative street theatre brought plays to the public, and the cabaret scene and jazz bands became very popular. According to the cliché, modern young women were Americanized, wearing makeup, short hair, smoking and breaking with traditional mores. The euphoria surrounding Josephine Baker in the metropolis of Berlin for instance, where she was declared an "erotic goddess" and in many ways admired and respected, kindled further "ultramodern" sensations in the minds of the German public. Art and a new type of architecture taught at "Bauhaus" schools reflected the new ideas of the time, with artists such as George Grosz being fined for defaming the military and for blasphemy.

Artists in Berlin were influenced by other contemporary progressive cultural movements, such as the Impressionist and Expressionist painters in Paris, as well as the Cubists. Likewise, American progressive architects were admired. Many of the new buildings built during this era followed a straight-lined, geometrical style. Examples of the new architecture include the Bauhaus Building by Gropius, Grosses Schauspielhaus, and the Einstein Tower.

Not everyone, however, was happy with the changes taking place in Weimar culture. Conservatives and reactionaries feared that Germany was betraying its traditional values by adopting popular styles from abroad, particularly those Hollywood was popularising in American films, while New York became the global capital of fashion. Germany was more susceptible to Americanization, because of the close economic links brought about by the Dawes plan.

In 1929, three years after receiving the 1926 Nobel Peace Prize, Stresemann died of a heart attack at age 51. When the New York Stock Exchange crashed in October 1929, American loans dried up and the sharp decline of the German economy brought the "Golden Twenties" to an abrupt end.

Social policy under Weimar
A wide range of progressive social reforms were carried out during and after the revolutionary period. In 1919, legislation provided for a maximum working 48-hour workweek, restrictions on night work, a half-holiday on Saturday, and a break of thirty-six hours of continuous rest during the week. That same year, health insurance was extended to wives and daughters without their own income, people only partially capable of gainful employment, people employed in private cooperatives, and people employed in public cooperatives. A series of progressive tax reforms were introduced under the auspices of Matthias Erzberger, including increases in taxes on capital and an increase in the highest income tax rate from 4% to 60%. Under a governmental decree of 3 February 1919, the German government met the demand of the veterans' associations that all aid for the disabled and their dependents be taken over by the central government (thus assuming responsibility for this assistance) and extended into peacetime the nationwide network of state and district welfare bureaus that had been set up during the war to coordinate social services for war widows and orphans.

The Imperial Youth Welfare Act of 1922 obliged all municipalities and states to set up youth offices in charge of child protection, and also codified a right to education for all children, while laws were passed to regulate rents and increase protection for tenants in 1922 and 1923. Health insurance coverage was extended to other categories of the population during the existence of the Weimar Republic, including seamen, people employed in the educational and social welfare sectors, and all primary dependents. Various improvements were also made in unemployment benefits, although in June 1920 the maximum amount of unemployment benefit that a family of four could receive in Berlin, 90 marks, was well below the minimum cost of subsistence of 304 marks.

In 1923, unemployment relief was consolidated into a regular programme of assistance following economic problems that year. In 1924, a modern public assistance programme was introduced, and in 1925 the accident insurance programme was reformed, allowing diseases that were linked to certain kinds of work to become insurable risks. In addition, a national unemployment insurance programme was introduced in 1927. Housing construction was also greatly accelerated during the Weimar period, with over 2 million new homes constructed between 1924 and 1931 and a further 195,000 modernised.

Renewed crisis and decline (1930–1933)

Onset of the Great Depression

In 1929, the onset of the depression in the United States of America produced a severe economic shock in Germany and was further made worse by the bankruptcy of the Austrian Creditanstalt bank. Germany's fragile economy had been sustained by the granting of loans through the Dawes Plan (1924) and the Young Plan (1929). When American banks withdrew their line of credit to German companies, the onset of severe unemployment could not be abated by conventional economic measures. Unemployment thereafter grew dramatically, at 4 million in 1930, and in September 1930 a political earthquake shook the republic to its foundations. The National Socialist German Workers' Party (NSDAP), until then a minor far-right party, increased its votes to 19%, becoming Germany's second largest party, while the Communist Party of Germany (KPD) also increased its votes; this made the unstable coalition system by which every chancellor had governed increasingly unworkable. The last years of the Weimar Republic were marred by even more systemic political instability than previous years, as political violence increased. Four Chancellors (Heinrich Brüning, Franz von Papen, Kurt von Schleicher) and, from 30 January to 23 March 1933, Hitler governed through presidential decree rather than through parliamentary consultation. This effectively rendered parliament as a means of enforcing constitutional checks and balances powerless.

Brüning's policy of deflation (1930–1932)
On 29 March 1930, after months of lobbying by General Kurt von Schleicher on behalf of the military, the finance expert Heinrich Brüning was appointed as Müller's successor by Reichspräsident Paul von Hindenburg. The new government was expected to lead a political shift towards conservatism.

As Brüning had no majority support in the Reichstag, he became, through the use of the emergency powers granted to the Reichspräsident (Article 48) by the constitution, the first Weimar chancellor to operate independently of parliament. This made him dependent on the Reichspräsident, Hindenburg. After a bill to reform the Reich's finances was opposed by the Reichstag, it was made an emergency decree by Hindenburg. On 18 July, as a result of opposition from the SPD, KPD, DNVP and the small contingent of NSDAP members, the Reichstag again rejected the bill by a slim margin. Immediately afterward, Brüning submitted the president's decree that the Reichstag be dissolved. The consequent general election on 14 September resulted in an enormous political shift within the Reichstag: 18.3% of the vote went to the NSDAP, five times the percentage won in 1928. As a result, it was no longer possible to form a pro-republican majority, not even with a grand coalition that excluded the KPD, DNVP and NSDAP. This encouraged an escalation in the number of public demonstrations and instances of paramilitary violence organised by the NSDAP.

Between 1930 and 1932, Brüning tried to reform the Weimar Republic without a parliamentary majority, governing, when necessary, through the President's emergency decrees. In line with the contemporary economic theory (subsequently termed "leave-it-alone liquidationism"), he enacted a draconian policy of deflation and drastically cutting state expenditure. Among other measures, he completely halted all public grants to the obligatory unemployment insurance introduced in 1927, resulting in workers making higher contributions and fewer benefits for the unemployed. Benefits for the sick, invalid and pensioners were also reduced sharply. Additional difficulties were caused by the different deflationary policies pursued by Brüning and the Reichsbank, Germany's central bank. In mid-1931, the United Kingdom abandoned the gold standard and about 30 countries (the sterling bloc) devalued their currencies, making their goods around 20% cheaper than those produced by Germany. As the Young Plan did not allow a devaluation of the Reichsmark, Brüning triggered a deflationary internal devaluation by forcing the economy to reduce prices, rents, salaries and wages by 20%. Debate continues as to whether this policy was without alternative: some argue that the Allies would not in any circumstances have allowed a devaluation of the Reichsmark, while others point to the Hoover Moratorium as a sign that the Allies understood that the situation had changed fundamentally and further German reparation payments were impossible. Brüning expected that the policy of deflation would temporarily worsen the economic situation before it began to improve, quickly increasing the German economy's competitiveness and then restoring its creditworthiness. His long-term view was that deflation would, in any case, be the best way to help the economy. His primary goal was to remove Germany's reparation payments by convincing the Allies that they could no longer be paid. Anton Erkelenz, chairman of the German Democratic Party and a contemporary critic of Brüning, famously said that the policy of deflation is:

In 1933, the American economist Irving Fisher developed the theory of debt deflation. He explained that a deflation causes a decline of profits, asset prices and a still greater decline in the net worth of businesses. Even healthy companies, therefore, may appear over-indebted and facing bankruptcy. The consensus today is that Brüning's policies exacerbated the German economic crisis and the population's growing frustration with democracy, contributing enormously to the increase in support for Hitler's NSDAP.

Most German capitalists and landowners originally supported the conservative experiment more from the belief that conservatives would best serve their interests rather than any particular liking for Brüning. As more of the working and middle classes turned against Brüning, however, more of the capitalists and landowners declared themselves in favour of his opponents Hitler and Hugenberg. By late 1931, the conservative movement was dead and Hindenburg and the Reichswehr had begun to contemplate dropping Brüning in favour of accommodating Hugenberg and Hitler. Although Hindenburg disliked Hugenberg and despised Hitler, he was no less a supporter of the sort of anti-democratic counter-revolution that the DNVP and NSDAP represented. In April 1932, Brüning had actively supported Hindenburg's successful campaign against Hitler for re-election as Reichspräsident; five weeks later, on 30 May 1932, he had lost Hindenburg's support and resigned as Reichskanzler.

While it is a popular theory that economic performance and democratic government are positively correlated (more resources and workers as a result of industrialization, stimulating economic growth), it is not the sole factor that popularized support for the NSDAP.  Instead, in her paper, “Civil Society and the Collapse of the Weimar Republic”, Sheri Berman states that Hitler was able to infiltrate civic groups and grow his base that way, citing the fragmenting characteristics of civil society as a main cause of the NSDAP’s rise to power. In these civic societies, groups instilled anti-democratic values in their participants. From there, Hitler was able to infiltrate these groups and use their leaders, working from the inside out and growing his base.

Since the government could not respond to all of these anti-democratic criticisms from these civil society groups, they (the civil society groups) aligned themselves with populist groups who would support them, eventually leading to the alignment with the Nazi party. As David Rieff states, civil society being a uniting force is true to the extent that people will be inherently good in their ideals. By using the heads of these committees, Hitler was able to spread his message in these groups and further his agenda without actually campaigning. Due to a “lack of any basic consensus about the past, present and future of the German state and society”, civic associations groups were sheep waiting to be led by a herder. Therefore, focusing on the contradictions and ambivalences of civil society will provide the real reason of the rise of the NSDAP.

Papen deal
Hindenburg then appointed Franz von Papen as new Reichskanzler. Papen lifted the ban on the NSDAP's SA paramilitary, imposed after the street riots, in an unsuccessful attempt to secure the backing of Hitler.

Papen was closely associated with the industrialist and land-owning classes and pursued an extremely conservative policy along Hindenburg's lines. He appointed as Reichswehr Minister Kurt von Schleicher, and all the members of the new cabinet were of the same political opinion as Hindenburg. The government was expected to assure itself of the co-operation of Hitler. Since the republicans were not yet ready to take action, the Communists did not want to support the republic and the conservatives had shot their political bolt, Hitler and Hugenberg were certain to achieve power.

Elections of July 1932
Because most parties opposed the new government, Papen had the Reichstag dissolved and called for new elections. The general elections on 31 July 1932 yielded major gains for the Communists, and for the Nazis, who won 37.3% of the vote—their high-water mark in a free election. The Nazi party then supplanted the Social Democrats as the largest party in the Reichstag, although it did not gain a majority.

The immediate question was what part the now large Nazi Party would play in the Government of the country. The party owed its huge increase to growing support from middle-class people, whose traditional parties were swallowed up by the Nazi Party. The millions of radical adherents at first forced the Party towards the Left. They wanted a renewed Germany and a new organisation of German society. The left of the Nazi party strove desperately against any drift into the train of such capitalist and feudal reactionaries. Therefore, Hitler refused ministry under Papen, and demanded the chancellorship for himself, but was rejected by Hindenburg on 13 August 1932. There was still no majority in the Reichstag for any government; as a result, the Reichstag was dissolved, and elections took place once more in the hope that a stable majority would result.

Schleicher cabinet
The 6 November 1932 elections yielded 33% for the Nazis, two million voters fewer than in the previous election. Franz von Papen stepped down and was succeeded as Chancellor (Reichskanzler) by General Kurt von Schleicher on 3 December. Schleicher, a retired army officer, had developed in an atmosphere of semi-obscurity and intrigue that encompassed the Republican military policy. He had for years been in the camp of those supporting the Conservative counter-revolution. Schleicher's bold and unsuccessful plan was to build a majority in the Reichstag by uniting the trade unionist left wings of the various parties, including that of the Nazis led by Gregor Strasser. This policy did not prove successful either.

In this brief Presidential Dictatorship intermission, Schleicher assumed the role of "Socialist General" and entered into relations with the Christian Trade Unions, the relatively left of the Nazi party, and even with the Social Democrats. Schleicher planned for a sort of labour government under his Generalship. But the Reichswehr officers were not prepared for this, the working class had a natural distrust of their future allies, and the great capitalists and landowners also did not like the plans.

Hitler learned from Papen that the general had not received from Hindenburg the authority to abolish the Reichstag parliament, whereas any majority of seats did. The cabinet (under a previous interpretation of Article 48) ruled without a sitting Reichstag, which could vote only for its own dissolution. Hitler also learned that all past crippling Nazi debts were to be relieved by German big business.

On 22 January, Hitler's efforts to persuade Oskar von Hindenburg, the President's son and confidant, included threats to bring criminal charges over estate taxation irregularities at the President's Neudeck estate; although  extra were soon allotted to Hindenburg's property. Outmaneuvered by Papen and Hitler on plans for the new cabinet, and having lost Hindenburg's confidence, Schleicher asked for new elections. On 28 January, Papen described Hitler to Paul von Hindenburg as only a minority part of an alternative, Papen-arranged government. The four great political movements, the SPD, Communists, Centre, and the Nazis were in opposition.

On 29 January, Hitler and Papen thwarted a last-minute threat of an officially sanctioned Reichswehr takeover, and on 30 January 1933 Hindenburg accepted the new Papen-Nationalist-Hitler coalition, with the Nazis holding only three of eleven Cabinet seats: Hitler as Chancellor, Wilhelm Frick as Minister of the Interior and Hermann Göring as Minister Without Portfolio. Later that day, the first cabinet meeting was attended by only two political parties, representing a minority in the Reichstag: The Nazis and the German National People's Party (DNVP), led by Alfred Hugenberg, with 196 and 52 seats respectively. Eyeing the Catholic Centre Party's 70 (plus 20 BVP) seats, Hitler refused their leader's demands for constitutional "concessions" (amounting to protection) and planned for dissolution of the Reichstag.

Hindenburg, despite his misgivings about the Nazis' goals and about Hitler as a personality, reluctantly agreed to Papen's theory that, with Nazi popular support on the wane, Hitler could now be controlled as Chancellor. This date, dubbed by the Nazis as the Machtergreifung (seizure of power), is commonly seen as the beginning of Nazi Germany.

End of the Weimar Republic

Hitler's chancellorship (1933)
Hitler was sworn in as Chancellor on the morning of 30 January 1933 in what some observers later described as a brief and indifferent ceremony. By early February, a mere week after Hitler's assumption of the chancellorship, the government had begun to clamp down on the opposition. Meetings of the left-wing parties were banned and even some of the moderate parties found their members threatened and assaulted. Measures with an appearance of legality suppressed the Communist Party in mid-February and included the plainly illegal arrests of Reichstag deputies.

On 27 February 1933 the Reichtstag burned to the ground, which was blamed on an act of arson by Dutch council communist Marinus van der Lubbe. However, in 2019, an affidavit that had been concealed by a prominent Nazi era German historian was uncovered. In the affidavit from the 1950s, a former member of the Nazis' paramilitary SA unit swore that on the night of the Reichstag fire, he was part of an SA group that drove Van der Lubbe from an infirmary to the Reichstag, where they noticed "a strange smell of burning and there were clouds of smoke billowing through the rooms". The fire already being set when der Lubbe was forcefully brought there by the SA, as well as the Nazi government's immediate use of the event to seize power, has led many contemporary historians to validate that the SA played a role in the arson, as a false flag attack. Hitler blamed the fire on the KPD (though Van der Lubbe was not a member of the party) and convinced Hindenburg to issue the Reichstag Fire Decree the following day. The decree invoked Article 48 of the Weimar Constitution and "indefinitely suspended" a number of constitutional protections of civil liberties, allowing the Nazi government to take swift action against political meetings, arresting and killing the Communists.

Hitler and the Nazis exploited the German state's broadcasting and aviation facilities in a massive attempt to sway the electorate, but this election yielded a scant majority of 16 seats for the NSDAP-DNVP coalition. At the Reichstag elections, which took place on 5 March 1933, the NSDAP obtained 17 million votes. The Communist, Social Democrat and Catholic Centre votes stood firm. This was the last multi-party election of the Weimar Republic and the last multi-party all-German election for 57 years.

Hitler addressed disparate interest groups, stressing the necessity for a definitive solution to the perpetual instability of the Weimar Republic. He now blamed Germany's problems on the Communists, even threatening their lives on 3 March. Former Chancellor Heinrich Brüning proclaimed that his Centre Party would resist any constitutional change and appealed to the President for an investigation of the Reichstag fire. Hitler's successful plan was to induce what remained of the now Communist-depleted Reichstag to grant him, and the Government, the authority to issue decrees with the force of law. The hitherto Presidential Dictatorship hereby was to give itself a new legal form.

On 15 March, the first cabinet meeting was attended by the two coalition parties, representing a minority in the Reichstag: The Nazis and the DNVP led by Alfred Hugenberg (288 + 52 seats). According to the Nuremberg Trials, this cabinet meeting's first order of business was how at last to achieve the complete counter-revolution by means of the constitutionally allowed Enabling Act, requiring a 66% parliamentary majority. This Act would, and did, lead Hitler and the NSDAP toward his goal of unfettered dictatorial powers.

Hitler cabinet meeting in mid-March
At the cabinet meeting on 15 March, Hitler introduced the Enabling Act, which would have authorised the cabinet to enact legislation without the approval of the Reichstag. Meanwhile, the only remaining question for the Nazis was whether the Catholic Centre Party would support the Enabling Act in the Reichstag, thereby providing the  majority required to ratify a law that amended the constitution. Hitler expressed his confidence to win over the centre's votes. Hitler is recorded at the Nuremberg Trials as being sure of eventual Centre Party Germany capitulation and thus rejecting of the DNVP's suggestions to "balance" the majority through further arrests, this time of Social Democrats. Hitler, however, assured his coalition partners that arrests would resume after the elections and, in fact, some 26 SPD Social Democrats were physically removed. After meeting with Centre leader Monsignor Ludwig Kaas and other Centre Trade Union leaders daily and denying them a substantial participation in the government, negotiation succeeded in respect of guarantees towards Catholic civil-servants and education issues.

At the last internal Centre meeting prior to the debate on the Enabling Act, Kaas expressed no preference or suggestion on the vote, but as a way of mollifying opposition by Centre members to the granting of further powers to Hitler, Kaas somehow arranged for a letter of constitutional guarantee from Hitler himself prior to his voting with the centre en bloc in favour of the Enabling Act. This guarantee was not ultimately given. Kaas, the party's chairman since 1928, had strong connections to the Vatican Secretary of State, later Pope Pius XII. In return for pledging his support for the act, Kaas would use his connections with the Vatican to set in train and draft the Holy See's long desired Reichskonkordat with Germany (only possible with the co-operation of the Nazis).

Ludwig Kaas is considered along with Papen as being one of the two most important political figures in the creation of the Nazi regime.

Enabling Act negotiations
On 20 March, negotiation began between Hitler and Frick on one side and the Catholic Centre Party (Zentrum) leaders—Kaas, Stegerwald, and Hackelsburger on the other. The aim was to settle on conditions under which Centre would vote in favour of the Enabling Act. Because of the Nazis' narrow majority in the Reichstag, Centre's support was necessary to receive the required two-thirds majority vote. On 22 March, the negotiations concluded; Hitler promised to continue the existence of the German states, agreed not to use the new grant of power to change the constitution, and promised to retain Zentrum members in the civil service. Hitler also pledged to protect the Catholic confessional schools and to respect the concordats signed between the Holy See and Bavaria (1924), Prussia (1929), and Baden (1931). Hitler also agreed to mention these promises in his speech to the Reichstag before the vote on the Enabling Act.

The ceremonial opening of the Reichstag on 21 March was held at the Garrison Church in Potsdam, a shrine of Prussianism, in the presence of many Junker landowners and representatives of the imperial military caste. This impressive and often emotional spectacle—orchestrated by Joseph Goebbels—aimed to link Hitler's government with Germany's imperial past and portray Nazism as a guarantor of the nation's future. The ceremony helped convince the "old guard" Prussian military elite of Hitler's homage to their long tradition and, in turn, produced the relatively convincing view that Hitler's government had the support of Germany's traditional protector—the Army. Such support would publicly signal a return to conservatism to curb the problems affecting the Weimar Republic, and that stability might be at hand. In a cynical and politically adroit move, Hitler bowed in apparently respectful humility before President and Field Marshal Hindenburg.

Passage of the Enabling Act
The Reichstag convened on 23 March 1933 at the Kroll Opera House, and in the midday opening, Hitler made a historic speech, appearing outwardly calm and conciliatory. Hitler presented an appealing prospect of respect towards Christianity by paying tribute to the Christian faiths as "essential elements for safeguarding the soul of the German people". He promised to respect their rights and declared that his government's "ambition is a peaceful accord between Church and State" and that he hoped "to improve [their] friendly relations with the Holy See". This speech aimed especially at the future recognition by the named Holy See and therefore to the votes of the Centre Party addressing many concerns Kaas had voiced during the previous talks. Kaas is considered to have had a hand therefore in the drafting of the speech. Kaas is also reported as voicing the Holy See's desire for Hitler as bulwark against atheistic Russian nihilism previously as early as May 1932.

Hitler promised that the Act did not threaten the existence of either the Reichstag or the Reichsrat, that the authority of the President remained untouched and that the Länder would not be abolished. During an adjournment, the other parties (notably the centre) met to discuss their intentions.

In the debate prior to the vote on the Enabling Act, Hitler orchestrated the full political menace of his paramilitary forces like the storm division in the streets to intimidate reluctant Reichstag deputies into approving the Enabling Act. The Communists' 81 seats had been empty since the Reichstag Fire Decree and other lesser known procedural measures, thus excluding their anticipated "No" votes from the balloting. Otto Wels, the leader of the Social Democrats, whose seats were similarly depleted from 120 to below 100, was the only speaker to defend democracy and in a futile but brave effort to deny Hitler the  majority, he made a speech critical of the abandonment of democracy to dictatorship. At this, Hitler could no longer restrain his wrath.

In his retort to Wels, Hitler abandoned earlier pretence at calm statesmanship and delivered a characteristic screaming diatribe, promising to exterminate all Communists in Germany and threatening Wels' Social Democrats as well. He did not even want their support for the bill. "Germany will become free, but not through you," he shouted. Meanwhile, Hitler's promised written guarantee to Monsignor Kaas was being typed up, it was asserted to Kaas, and thereby Kaas was persuaded to silently deliver the Centre bloc's votes for the Enabling Act anyway. The Act—formally titled the "Act for the Removal of Distress from People and Reich"—was passed by a vote of 444 to 94. Only the SPD had voted against the Act. Every other member of the Reichstag, whether from the largest or the smallest party, voted in favour of the Act. It went into effect the following day, 24 March.

Consequences

The passage of the Enabling Act of 1933 is widely considered to mark the end of the Weimar Republic and the beginning of the Nazi era. It empowered the cabinet to legislate without the approval of the Reichstag or the President, and to enact laws that were contrary to the constitution. Before the March 1933 elections, Hitler had persuaded Hindenburg to promulgate the Reichstag Fire Decree using Article 48, which empowered the government to restrict "the rights of habeas corpus [...] freedom of the press, the freedom to organise and assemble, the privacy of postal, telegraphic and telephonic communications" and legalised search warrants and confiscation "beyond legal limits otherwise prescribed". This was intended to forestall any action against the government by the Communists. Hitler used the provisions of the Enabling Act to pre-empt possible opposition to his dictatorship from other sources, in which he was mostly successful: in the months following the passage of the Enabling Act, all German parties aside the NSDAP were banned or force to disband themselves, all trade unions were dissolved and all media were brought under the control of the Reich Ministry of Public Enlightenment and Propaganda (with the partial exception of the Frankfurter Zeitung). The Reichstag was then dissolved by Hindenburg and a snap one-party election was called in November 1933, giving the NSDAP full control of the chamber.

The constitution of 1919 was never formally repealed, but the Enabling Act meant that it was a dead letter. The Reichstag was effectively eliminated as an active player in German politics. It only met sporadically until the end of World War II, held no debates and enacted only a few laws; for all purposes, it was reduced to a mere stage for Hitler's speeches. The other chamber of the German parliament (the Reichsrat) was officially abolished in February 1934; this decision was in clear violation of the Enabling Act, which stipulated that any laws passed under its authority could not affect the institutions of either chamber. By this time, however, the Nazis had become law unto themselves, and these actions were never challenged in court.

On 2 August 1934, Hindenburg died from lung cancer, thus eliminating any remaining obstacle to Nazi full dominance; the day after his death, the Hitler Cabinet passed a "Law Concerning the Highest State Office of the Reich", transferring the President's powers to the new post of "Führer and Reich chancellor", giving him complete power on all the Reich without any possibility of check and balance. Such move was later ratified by a highly non-democratic referendum. This, along with the remilitarization of the Rhineland in 1936 shed the last remains of the Weimar Republic.

Reasons for failure

The reasons for the Weimar Republic's collapse are the subject of continuing debate. It may have been doomed from the beginning since even moderates disliked it and extremists on both the left and right loathed it, a situation often referred to as a "democracy without democrats". Germany had limited democratic traditions, and Weimar democracy was widely seen as chaotic. Since Weimar politicians had been blamed for the Dolchstoß ("stab-in-the-back"), a widely believed theory that Germany's surrender in the First World War had been the unnecessary act of traitors, the popular legitimacy of the government was on shaky ground. As normal parliamentary lawmaking broke down and was replaced around 1930 by a series of emergency decrees, the decreasing popular legitimacy of the government further drove voters to extremist parties.

No single reason can explain the failure of the Weimar Republic. The most commonly asserted causes can be grouped into three categories: economic problems, institutional problems, and the roles of specific individuals.

Economic problems

The Weimar Republic had some of the most serious economic problems ever experienced by any Western democracy in history. Rampant hyperinflation, massive unemployment, and a large drop in living standards were primary factors. From 1923 to 1929, there was a short period of economic recovery, but the Great Depression of the 1930s led to a worldwide recession. Germany was particularly affected because it depended heavily on American loans. In 1926, about 2 million Germans were unemployed, which rose to around 6 million in 1932. Many blamed the Weimar Republic. That was made apparent when political parties on both right and left wanting to disband the Republic altogether made any democratic majority in Parliament impossible.

The Weimar Republic was severely affected by the Great Depression. The economic stagnation led to increased demands on Germany to repay the debts owed to the United States. As the Weimar Republic was very fragile in all its existence, the depression was devastating, and played a major role in the Nazi takeover.

Most Germans thought the Treaty of Versailles was a punishing and degrading document because it forced them to surrender resource-rich areas and pay massive amounts of compensation. The punitive reparations caused consternation and resentment, but the actual economic damage resulting from the Treaty of Versailles is difficult to determine. While the official reparations were considerable, Germany ended up paying only a fraction of them. However, the reparations damaged Germany's economy by discouraging market loans, which forced the Weimar government to finance its deficit by printing more currency, causing rampant hyperinflation. At the beginning of 1920, 50 marks was equivalent to one US dollar. By the end of 1923, one US dollar was equal to 4,200,000,000,000 marks. In addition, the rapid disintegration of Germany in 1919 by the return of a disillusioned army, the rapid change from possible victory in 1918 to defeat in 1919, and the political chaos may have led to extreme nationalism. 

Princeton historian Harold James argues that there was a clear link between economic decline and people turning to extremist politics.

Institutional problems
It is widely believed that the 1919 constitution had several weaknesses, making the eventual establishment of a dictatorship likely, but it is unknown whether a different constitution could have prevented the rise of the Nazi party. However, the 1949 West German constitution (the Basic Law of the Federal Republic of Germany) is generally viewed as a strong response to these flaws.
The institution of the Reichspräsident was frequently considered as an Ersatzkaiser ("substitute emperor"), an attempt to replace the emperors with a similarly strong institution meant to diminish party politics. Article 48 of the Constitution gave the President power to "take all necessary steps" if "public order and security are seriously disturbed or endangered". Although it was intended as an emergency clause, it was often used before 1933 to issue decrees without the support of Parliament (see above) and also made Gleichschaltung easier.
During the Weimar Republic, it was accepted that a law did not have to conform to the constitution as long as it had the support of two-thirds of parliament, the same majority needed to change the constitution (verfassungsdurchbrechende Gesetze). That was a precedent for the Enabling Act of 1933. The Basic Law of 1949 requires an explicit change of the wording, and it prohibits abolishing the basic rights or the federal structure of the republic.
The use of a proportional representation without large thresholds meant a party with a small amount of support could gain entry into the Reichstag. That led to many small parties, some extremist, building political bases within the system, and made it difficult to form and maintain a stable coalition government, further contributing to instability. To counter the problem, the modern German Bundestag introduced a 5% threshold limit for a party to gain parliamentary representation. However, the Reichstag of the monarchy was fractioned to a similar degree even if it was elected by majority vote (under a two-round system).
The Reichstag could remove the Reichskanzler from office even if it was unable to agree on a successor. The use of such a motion of no confidence meant that since 1932, a government could not be held in office when the parliament came together. As a result, the 1949 Grundgesetz ("Basic Law") stipulates that a chancellor may not be removed by Parliament unless a successor is elected at the same time, known as a "constructive vote of no confidence".
The basic rights such as freedom of speech, habeas corpus, freedom of religion, freedom of press, right to a fair trial, privacy of any kind, etc., precisely articles 114, 115, 117, 118, 123, 124 and 153 of the Weimar Constitution were merely listed as conditional state objectives, thus vulnerable to eventual suspension by Article 48, misused by the Nazi dictatorship. For this reason, the Basic Law lists them as fundamental rights, where they cannot legally be nullified, with the right to resist even added as a civilian duty in case of similar severe attempts at establishing a totalitarian regime.

Role of individuals
Brüning's economic policy from 1930 to 1932 has been the subject of much debate. It caused many Germans to identify the Republic with cuts in social spending and extremely liberal economics. Whether there were alternatives to this policy during the Great Depression is an open question.

Paul von Hindenburg became Reichspräsident in 1925. As he was an old style monarchist conservative, he had little love lost for the Republic, but for the most part, he formally acted within the bounds of the constitution; however, he ultimately—on the advice of his son and others close to him—appointed Hitler chancellor, thereby effectively ending the Republic. Additionally, Hindenburg's death in 1934 ended the last obstacle for Hitler to assume full power in the Weimar Republic.

The German National People's Party (DNVP) has also been blamed as responsible for the downfall of the Weimar Republic because of its ultranationalist positions and its unwillingness of accepting the Republic because of its monarchist ideology. In his book, The Rise and Fall of the Third Reich, journalist and historian William L. Shirer wrote that the DNVP's status as a far-right party rather than a mainstream conservative party was one of the main reasons for the Weimar Republic's downfall. In Shirer's view, the DNVP's refusal to "take a responsible position either in the government or in the opposition" during most of Weimar's existence denied Weimar "that stability provided in many other countries by a truly conservative party." Similarly, conservative British historian Sir John Wheeler-Bennett blamed the DNVP for failing to reconcile with the Republic, stating that "Under the cloak of loyalty to the Monarchy, they either held aloof or sabotaged the efforts of successive Chancellors to give a stable government to the Republic. The truth is that after 1918 many German Nationalists were more influenced by feelings of disloyalty to the Republic than of loyalty to the Kaiser, and it was this motive which led them to make their fatal contribution to bringing Hitler to power".

Legacy 
Nazi propaganda tended to describe the Weimar Republic as a period of treason, degeneration, and corruption. The whole period from 1918 to 1933 was described in propaganda as "The time of the System" (Systemzeit), while the Republic itself was known as "The System" (Das System), a term that was adopted into everyday use after 1933. Another Nazi phrase used for the republic and its politicians was "the November criminals" or "the regime of the November criminals" (German: November-Verbrecher), referring to the month the republic was founded in (November 1918).

The Weimar Republic brought democratic voting rights to all adults (including women), the eight-hour work day, innovations in media and technology, and more freedom for LGBT people, though the latter was undone by the strongly and extreme homophobic policies of Nazi Germany and by the conservative positions of the governments both in West and East Germany., although the modern Germany regained similar freedom for the LGBT people as the Weimar Republic did.

According to Foreign Policy, the Weimar Republic is seen as "the best-known historical example of a 'failed' democracy that ceded to fascism".

Constituent states

Prior to the First World War, the constituent states of the German Empire were 22 smaller monarchies, three republican city-states, and the Imperial Territory of Alsace–Lorraine. After the territorial losses of the Treaty of Versailles and the German Revolution of 1918–1919, the remaining states continued as republics. The former Ernestine duchies continued briefly as republics before merging to form the state of Thuringia in 1920, except for Saxe-Coburg, which became part of Bavaria.

These states were gradually abolished under the Nazi regime via the Gleichschaltung process, whereby they were effectively replaced by Gaue. There were two notable de jure changes, however. At the end of 1933, Mecklenburg-Strelitz was merged with Mecklenburg-Schwerin to form a united Mecklenburg. Second, in April 1937, the city-state of Lübeck was formally incorporated into Prussia by the Greater Hamburg Act, apparently motivated by Hitler's personal dislike for the city. Most of the remaining states were formally dissolved by the Allies at the end of the Second World War and ultimately reorganised into the modern states of Germany.

See also

Timeline of the Weimar Republic
Württemberg Landtag elections in the Weimar Republic

References

Explanatory notes

Citations

General and cited sources

Further reading

Bennett, Edward W. Germany and the diplomacy of the financial crisis, 1931 (1962) Online free to borrow.

 online free to borrow

Evans, Richard J. The Coming of the Third Reich (2003), a standard scholarly survey; part of three volume history 1919–1945.
Eyck, Erich. A history of the Weimar Republic: v. 1. From the collapse of the Empire to Hindenburg's election. (1962)online free to borrow

Halperin, S. William. Germany Tried Democracy: A Political History of the Reich from 1918 to 1933 (1946) online.

Rosenberg, Arthur. A History of the German Republic (1936) 370pp online
 ch 18–25.

Primary sources

Kaes, Anton, Martin Jay and Edward Dimendberg, eds. The Weimar Republic Sourcebook,(U of California Press, 1994).
Price, Morgan Philips. Dispatches from the Weimar Republic: Versailles and German Fascism (1999), reporting by an English journalist

Historiography
Bryden, Eric Jefferson. "In search of founding fathers: Republican historical narratives in Weimar Germany, 1918–1933" (PhD thesis. University of California, Davis, 2008).

Gerwarth, Robert. "The past in Weimar History" Contemporary European History 15#1 (2006), pp. 1–22 online
Graf, Rüdiger. "Either-or: The narrative of 'crisis' in Weimar Germany and in historiography." Central European History 43.4 (2010): 592–615. online
Haffert, Lukas, Nils Redeker, and Tobias Rommel. "Misremembering Weimar: Hyperinflation, the Great Depression, and German collective economic memory." Economics & Politics 33.3 (2021): 664–686. online
Von der Goltz, Anna. Hindenburg: Power, Myth, and the Rise of the Nazis (Oxford University Press, 2009)

External links
Documentarchiv.de: Historical documents 
National Library of Israel.org: Weimar Republic collection

 

1910s in Germany
.
1930s in Germany
20th century in Germany by period
Aftermath of World War I in Germany
Former countries of the interwar period
Former republics
States and territories established in 1918
States and territories disestablished in 1933
Great Depression
Modern history of Germany
Weimar culture